King Fahd International Airport (KFIA) , also known as Dammam International Airport or simply Dammam Airport or King Fahd Airport, is the international airport serving Dammam, Saudi Arabia. The airport is located 31 kilometres (19 miles) northwest of downtown Dammam and is named after the former King of Saudi Arabia, Fahd ibn Abdulaziz (1921–2005). The airport serves the entire Eastern Province of Saudi Arabia and is one of the three primary international airports in the kingdom.

Formerly a US airbase used primarily during the Gulf War, the airport has been overseeing commercial operations since 28 November 1999 and has since expanded to provide connections to 43 destinations. Before King Fahd International, the primary airport serving the region was the much busier Dhahran International Airport, which has since been converted for military use and is now designated the King Abdulaziz Air Base. Since July 1, 2017, the airport has been operated and managed by the Dammam Airports Company (DACO). Commercial transport was only halted once throughout the history of the airport, when on March 21, 2020, the Saudi Press Agency (SPA) announced the suspension of all domestic and international travel both within and to and from the kingdom. Domestic operations were reinitiated on May 31.

The third largest airport in the kingdom by passenger volume, more than 10 million passengers use King Fahd International each year, and 37 airlines operate flights in and out of the airport. The airport serves as a hub to Saudia and Flynas. It previously served as a hub to the now defunct Sama airline. In addition to these airlines, Saudi Aramco Aviation, the airline operated by Saudi Aramco, the state-owned oil giant, uses it to transport employees in and out of strategic locations such as Yanbu, Tanajib and Shaybah, also flies out of the airport.

The airport is served by two runways; both 4 kilometres (2.5 mi) long, and consists of three terminal buildings: the Passenger Terminal serves mainstream passengers, the Aramco Terminal is used by Aramco employees to board Saudi Aramco Aviation flights and the Royal Terminal is reserved for use by the Saudi royal family. The busiest route operated between Dammam and another city is to and from Dubai, with 70 weekly flights.

History 

The airport is named for King Fahd, under whose reign it was constructed and inaugurated. Design of the airport building began in 1976. The site master plan was created by architecture firm Yamasaki & Associates and Boeing and completed in 1977, with construction beginning in 1983. The basic infrastructure of the airport was complete by the end of 1990, which allowed the U.S-led coalition forces to use the airport during the Gulf War in early 1991 for the storage of military aircraft, including 144 A-10 Thunderbolt IIs, among other aircraft such as the AH-64 Apaches and CH-47 Chinooks of the 101st Airborne Division, before operations were transferred to the Ahmad al-Jaber Air Base in Kuwait.

The General Authority of Civil Aviation of Saudi Arabia inaugurated the King Fahd International Airport and opened it to commercial traffic on 28 November 1999, and all airlines transferred their operations from the Dhahran International Airport, which had been in use until then. Dhahran International has since been converted for military usage and was designated the King Abdulaziz Air Base.

As part of the Saudi Vision 2030 and the National Transformation Program, King Fahd International was corporatized in July 2017 under the Dammam Airports Company (DACO), which operates and maintains the airport. In an effort to mitigate the spread of COVID-19, all domestic and international flights were suspended until further notice on 21 March 2020. Following strict curfews and lowering in case numbers, domestic flights were allowed to operate once again on May 31. International flights are still suspended as of September 2020.

Facilities
The airport is classified as Code E by the ICAO which means aircraft such as the Boeing 747-400 and A340-600 could be easily accommodated. It is practically possible for an A380 to use the airport, but this is not recommended as in order to accommodate such aircraft, an airport is required to be Code F; only the runways at Dammam Airport meet Code F requirements; the taxiways and gates do not.

Terminals 
Approximately  were built in the first phase, in addition to 11 fixed passenger boarding bridges serving 15 gates. The original design included 31 fixed boarding bridges. The departure terminal is equipped with several customer counters of which 66 were allocated to Saudia (now shared with flynas), 44 to foreign airlines, and the rest for customs and immigration.

King Fahd International Airport was the first Saudi airport to adopt duty-free stores. In addition to the spaces allocated to duty-free stores, the airport has a separate area for shops specializing in the sale of gifts and all passenger-related goods. This area includes restaurants, cafeterias, and banks, and is located on the arrivals level. The distinction is largely meaningless, however, as the Kingdom has no sales or import duties on any products.

The private airline operated by Saudi Aramco, Saudi Aramco Aviation, operates out of the Aramco Terminal, providing connections to its employees to faraway company locations such as in Yanbu, Tanajib, Shaybah and Haradh, in addition to some remote pump stations, using their own fleet of Boeing 737s and Embraer ERJ-170LRs.

The Royal Terminal is reserved for the royal family of Saudi Arabia, government personnel, and official guests. It is luxuriously furnished and decorated, and includes extensively landscaped exteriors and grounds. Despite its specialized purpose, the terminal is rarely used by the royal family, who generally prefer to utilize a similar special terminal at King Abdulaziz Air Base.

Runways 
The airport has two parallel runways with a length of  each: 16L/34R and 16R/34L, in addition to taxiways parallel to the runways and a cross taxiway to connect the two runways. The east runway is generally used by Saudi Aramco while commercial airlines use the west one. A third parallel runway is under construction.

Ground transportation 
The terminal can only be accessed via Route 605, a secondary expressway linking the cities of Khobar and Dammam in the south, and Qatif in the north; to the airport. Route 6466, a minor road and spur of Highway 40, links the highway to Route 605 and the airport. SAPTCO offers bus connections from Khobar and Dammam to the airport. Taxis are available at fixed prices to every major city and town in the kingdom, with private companies such as Careem, a subsidiary of Uber, providing similar services.

Two open parking areas are available beside the rentals to accommodate additional cars.

Other facilities 
The Airport Mosque was built on the roof of the car park and in the middle of a landscaped area of 46,200 m2 (497,292 ft²). The architecture of the mosque is an amalgamation of modern architecture with traditional Islamic architectural elements. The mosque can accommodate up to 2,000 worshippers and access to it can be easily gained from the passenger terminal through two enclosed, air-conditioned bridges equipped with moving belts, in addition to a third open bridge.

The nursery supplies the airport gardens and planted areas with trees and plants. The height allows visibility of all operational parts of the airport.

Airlines and destinations

Passenger

Cargo

Statistics
At present, around 9.7 million passengers use King Fahd International Airport annually.

Records 

 King Fahd International has been cited as the largest airport in the world by the Guinness Book of World Records. At 776 square kilometres (300 mi2), the property is larger than the neighbouring country of Bahrain.
 In May 2009, the Antonov An-225 Mriya, the world's largest aircraft, landed at the airport en route from Ukraine to Tanzania.

Accidents and incidents

 On February 1, 2020, Saudia Flight 919, a Boeing 747-400F operated by Air ACT and destined for Zaragoza, Spain, suffered a tail strike upon takeoff from the airport. The aircraft entered a holding pattern west of the airport before diverting to Jeddah, landing at King Abdulaziz International Airport three hours later.

See also
 Saudia
 Amaala International Airport
 List of things named after Saudi Kings

References

External links

 FlightRadar24 Live Movement of KFIA
 King Fahd International Airport
 
 
 

Airports in Saudi Arabia
Transport in Dammam
1999 establishments in Saudi Arabia
Airports established in 1999
Dhahran
Khobar
Ras Tanura
Minoru Yamasaki buildings